Yzeux is a commune in the Somme department in Hauts-de-France in northern France.

Geography
Yzeux is 10 miles(16 km) northwest of Amiens, on the D259 road and by the banks of the river Somme.

Population

See also
Communes of the Somme department

References

Communes of Somme (department)